Hans Wendlandt (18 January 1918 – 20 February 1978) was a German former football player and manager. He managed Arminia Bielefeld from 1966 to 1969.

External links

1918 births
1978 deaths
German footballers
SC Victoria Hamburg players
Association football midfielders
German football managers
SV Waldhof Mannheim managers
Arminia Bielefeld managers